Gluconacetobacter is a genus in the phylum Pseudomonadota (Bacteria). In 2012, several species previously classified in the genus Gluconacetobacter were reclassified under the new genus Komagataeibacter, including the cellulose producing species Komagataeibacter xylinus.

Etymology
The name Gluconacetobacter derives from: New Latin acidum gluconicum, gluconic acid; Latin noun acetum, vinegar; New Latin bacter, rod; giving Gluconacetobacter, gluconate-vinegar rod.

Species
The genus contains the following species:
 Gluconacetobacter aggeris corrig. Nishijima et al. 2013
 Gluconacetobacter asukensis Tazato et al. 2012
 Gluconacetobacter azotocaptans Fuentes-Ramírez et al. 2001
 Gluconacetobacter diazotrophicus corrig. (Gillis et al. 1989) Yamada et al. 1998
 Gluconacetobacter dulcium Sombolestani et al. 2021
 Gluconacetobacter entanii Schüller et al. 2000

 Gluconacetobacter johannae Fuentes-Ramírez et al. 2001

 Gluconacetobacter liquefaciens corrig. (Asai 1935) Yamada et al. 1998

 Gluconacetobacter sacchari Franke et al. 1999

 Gluconacetobacter takamatsuzukensis Nishijima et al. 2013
 Gluconacetobacter tumulicola Tazato et al. 2012
 Gluconacetobacter tumulisoli Nishijima et al. 2013

See also
 Bacterial taxonomy
 Kombucha
 Microbiology

References 

Bacteria genera
Rhodospirillales
Taxa described in 1998